Houttuyn is a surname. Notable people with the surname include:

 Petrus Houttuyn (1648–1709), Dutch botanist and medic
 Martinus Houttuyn (1720–1798), Dutch naturalist